Edmund William McGregor Mackey (March 8, 1846 – January 27, 1884) was a lawyer, state representative, and United States Representative from South Carolina. He was a leader in the Republican Party.

Life and career

Born in Charleston, his father was Dr. Albert Mackey, who was the primary founder of Scottish Rite Freemasonry.

Edmund became a representative after the end of the American Civil War. An active Republican, he was nominated to be a delegate from Charleston for the constitutional convention of South Carolina in 1868. He was admitted to the bar in 1868 and practiced law in Charleston while also serving as sheriff and alderman.

Mackey was elected as a Republican to South Carolina House of Representatives in 1872. He campaigned successfully in 1874 as an Independent Republican for the Second Congressional District. The Forty-fourth Congress declared his seat vacant on July 19, 1876.

He was elected again to the South Carolina House of Representatives in 1876 and claimed to be the Speaker after a tumultuous campaign in the state, marked by violence and intimidation.  Republicans disputed the election of Democratic Representatives from Edgefield and Laurens counties because of massive fraud in the election and barring of freedmen from the polls by Democratic Party Red Shirts.  Following the South Carolina Supreme Court's decision to allow seating of elected legislators from Edgefield and Laurens counties, rival state governments assembled. Mackey and the Republican legislators occupied the South Carolina State House with the support of Federal troops.

The order of President Hayes to remove Federal troops from South Carolina on April 10, 1877, a result of a political compromise ended the Republicans' struggle to control state government. The Democrats annulled the election of representatives from Charleston County, including Edmund Mackey.

Mackey continued to be active in public life serving as an assistant United States attorney for South Carolina from 1878 to 1881.  Mackey attempted to win election as a Republican to the U.S. House of Representatives from South Carolina, but lost the election against Michael P. O’Connor for the 2nd congressional district in 1878 and failed to have the Democratic-controlled House overturn the election.  With the Republican takeover of the House for the Forty-seventh Congress, Mackey succeeded in replacing Samuel Dibble for the House seat. Re-elected in 1882 from the Seventh Congressional District, Mackey died during the term in Washington, D.C. on January 27, 1884.

See also
List of United States Congress members who died in office (1790–1899)

Citations

References

External links
Congressional Biography

Politicians from Charleston, South Carolina
1846 births
1884 deaths
South Carolina Independents
Independent Republican members of the United States House of Representatives
Republican Party members of the United States House of Representatives from South Carolina
19th-century American politicians
Lawyers from Charleston, South Carolina
19th-century American lawyers
Burials at Glenwood Cemetery (Washington, D.C.)